The New Year Honours 1915 were appointments by King George V to various orders and honours to reward and highlight good works by members of the British Empire. They were announced on 1 January 1915.

Order of the Bath

Knight Commander (KCB)
Civil Division
Edmund Ernest Nott-Bower, Esq., C.B., Chairman of the Board of Inland Revenue.
Lionel Abrahams, Esq., C.B., Assistant Under Secretary of State, India Office.

Companion (CB)
Military Division
Captain Noel Grant, R.N., (H.M.S. "Carmania").
Captain John Collings Taswell Glossop, R.N. (H.M.A.S. "Sydney").
Commander James Barr, R.N.R. (H.M.S. "Carmania").

Civil Division
Captain Richard Webb, R.N.
Fleet-Paymaster Charles John Ehrhardt Rotter, R.N.
Basil Phillott Blackett, Esq., First Class Clerk, The Treasury.
George Russell Clerk, Esq., C.M.G., Senior Clerk, Foreign Office.
James Edward Masterton Smith, Esq., Private Secretary to the First Lord of the Admiralty.

Order of the Star of India

Knight Commander (KCSI)
Major-General William Riddell Birdwood, C.B., C.S.I., C.I.E., D.S.O., late Secretary in the Army Department to the Government of India.

Order of Saint Michael and Saint George

Knight Grand Cross (GCMG)
The Right Honourable Sir Louis Mallet, K.C.M.G., C.B., lately His Majesty's Ambassador Extraordinary and Plenipotentiary at Constantinople.

Knight Commander (KCMG)
Wilfred Collet, Esq., C.M.G., Governor and Commander-in-Chief of the Colony of British Honduras.
George Basil Haddon-Smith, Esq., C.M.G., Governor and Commander-in-Chief of the Windward Islands.
The Honourable George Halsey Perley, Minister of the Dominion of Canada; at present in charge of the office of the High Commissioner in London for the Dominion.
The Honourable Robert Philp, formerly Premier of the State of Queensland.
The Honourable Clifford Sifton, K.C., Member of the King's Privy Council for Canada, and formerly Minister of the Interior of the Dominion.

Companion (CMG)
Frederic Chapple, Esq., Head Master of Prince Alfred College, Adelaide.
Charles Thomas Davis, Esq., of the Colonial Office.
George Joseph Desbarats, Esq., Deputy Minister and Comptroller of the Naval Service of the Dominion of Canada.
Laurence Stirling Eliot, Esq., I.S.O., lately Under Treasurer of the State of Western Australia.
Surgeon-Major-General Eugène Fiset, M.D., D.S.O., Deputy Minister of Militia and Defence of the Dominion of Canada.
Edward Allan Grannum, Esq., Receiver-General of the Colony of Mauritius.
George Hogben, Esq., Inspector-General of Schools, Dominion of New Zealand.
Loke Yew, Esq., of Selangor, Federated Malay States.
Thomas Slingsby Nightingale, Esq., Secretary, Office of the High Commissioner in London for the Union of South Africa.
John Houston Sinclair, Esq., Chief Secretary, Zanzibar.
Charles Bruce Locker Tennyson, Esq., Legal Assistant, Colonial Office.
Captain Charles Walter Barton, D.S.O., The King's African Rifles. (Nyasaland. Additional Member, in connection with military operations.)
Brigadier-General Charles Macpherson Dobell, D.S.O., A.D.C., Inspector-General of the West African Frontier Force.(West Africa. Additional Member, in connection with military operations.)
Captain Cyril Thomas Moulden Fuller, of His Majesty's Cruiser "Cumberland."(West Africa. Additional Member, in connection with military operations.)
Charles Alfred Bell, Esq., of the Indian Civil Service, for services in connection with the Tibet Conference, 1913.
Richard William Brant, Esq., lately Librarian and Keeper of the Papers, Foreign Office.

Order of the Indian Empire

Knight Grand Commander (GCIE)
Maharaja Sir Velugoti Sri Rajagopala Krishna Yachendralavarti Bahadur, K.C.I.E., Panchhazari Mansabdar, of Venkatagiri.
Sir Sri Kantirava Narasinharaja Wadiyar Bahadur, K.C.I.E., Yuvaraja of Mysore.

Companion (CIE)
Abdulla bin Esa, son of Sheikh Esa bin Ali al Khalifa, the Chief of Bahrein. (Honorary)
The Reverend James Caruthers Rhea Ewing, D.D., LL.D., M.A., Principal of the Forman Christian College, Lahore, Punjab. (Honorary)
Claude Dundas James Carmichael, Esq., Indian Police, Deputy Inspector-General of Police, Madras.
Meherali Fazulbhoy Chinoy, Sheriff of Bombay, and an Additional Member of the Council of the Governor for making Laws and Regulations.
Kiran Chandra De, Esq., B.A., Indian Civil Service, Magistrate and Collector, Bengal.
Frank Willington Carter, Esq.
Charles Montague King, Esq., Indian Civil Service, Deputy Commissioner of Amritsar, Punjab.
Khan Bahadur Sheikh Riaz Hussein, Honorary Extra Assistant Commissioner and Magistrate of Multan, Punjab.
Edward Rawson Gardiner, Esq., Indian Public Works Department, Chief Engineer and Secretary to the Government of Bihar and Orissa, and a Member of the Council of the Lieutenant-Governor for making Laws and Regulations.
George Thomas Barlow, Esq., Superintending Engineer, Irrigation Branch, Public Works Department, United Provinces.
Frederick Samuel Philip Swann, Esq., Indian Civil Service, Magistrate and Collector, Banda, United Provinces.
Berkeley John Byng Stephens, Esq., a Member of the Council of the Lieutenant-Governor of Burma for making Laws and Regulations.
Mir Kamal Khan, Jam of Las Bela, Kalat, Baluchistan.
Captain Walter Lumsden, C.V.O., R.N. (retired), Director of the Royal Indian Marine.
Colonel Dewan Bishan Das, Military Secretary to the Commander-in-Chief, Jammu and Kashmir State.
Mager Frederic Gauntlett, Esq., Indian Civil Service, lately Comptroller and Auditor-General.
Major Samuel Richard Christophers, M.B., Indian Medical Service, Officer in Charge of the Malarial Bureau at the Central Research Institute, Kasauli.
Colonel George William Patrick Dennys, Indian Medical Service, Inspector-General of Civil Hospitals, Central Provinces, and a Member of the Council of the Chief Commissioner for making Laws and Regulations.
William Peter Sangster, Esq., Indian Public Works Department, Executive Engineer, Malakand Division, Upper Swat River Canal, North-West Frontier Province.
Captain William Henry Irvine Shakespear, Indian Army, Political Department, lately Political Agent, Koweit, Persian Gulf.
Montague Hill, Esq., Indian Forest Department, Chief Conservator of Forests, Central Provinces, and lately Officiating Inspector-General of Forests.
Captain Frederick Marshman Bailey, Indian Army, Political Department.
Sahibzada Abdus Samad Khan, Chief Secretary to His Highness the Nawab of Rampur, United Provinces.

Royal Victorian Order

Knight Grand Cross (GCVO)
His Highness Prince Leopold Arthur Louis of Battenberg, K.C.V.O.

Commander (CVO)
Major Clive Wigram, C.S.I., M.V.O., Assistant Private Secretary and Equerry in Waiting to His Majesty.
John Marnoch, Esq., Regius Professor of Surgery, Aberdeen University.

Member, 4th Class

Member, 5th Class
Carpenter Lieutenant John William Sheldrake, Royal Navy. On promotion from His Majesty's yacht "Victoria and Albert." (Dated 1 October 1914.)

Imperial Service Order (ISO)

Home Civil Service
Walter Matthew Gibson, Esq., M.V.O., Secretary of His Majesty's Privy Purse.

Edward Medal
James Kennedy, of the Earnoch Colliery, Lanark.
Joseph Cook, of the Blackhouse Colliery, Durham.

King's Police Medal (KPM)

England and Wales
Police Forces
Major Otway Mayne, Chief Constable of Buckinghamshire.
Lieutenant-Colonel Llewellyn William Atcherley, M.V.O., Chief Constable of West Yorkshire
Dr. J. B. Wright, Chief Constable of the Newcastle upon Tyne City Police and Director of the Fire Brigade.
John Stirling, Head Constable of the Great Grimsby Borough Police.
James A. P. Powell, Superintendent, Metropolitan Police.
William Harrison, Superintendent and Deputy Chief Constable, Gloucestershire Constabulary.
John Gleed, Superintendent and Chief Clerk, Warwickshire Constabulary.
Horace Ellis, Superintendent and Deputy Chief Constable,West Sussex Constabulary. 
John Thomas Pearman, Superintendent, 1 Buckinghamshire Constabulary.
Robert Faulkner, Superintendent and Deputy Chief Constable, Derbyshire Constabulary.
Henry Warner, Superintendent, Ipswich Borough Police.
William Gabriel Hooper, Superintendent, Northamptonshire Constabulary.
James Barnes, Chief Superintendent and Chief Clerk, Lancashire Constabulary.
Henry Wakeford, Superintendent, Hampshire Constabulary.
Sidney Burfield, Sergeant, Metropolitan Police.
Frederick Brown, George Roberts, Thomas Wright, Henry Brown, John Walker, Frederick West, Constables, Metropolitan Police.
Joseph Greedy, Constable, Somersetshire Constabulary.
Edwin Lawty, Constable, Guildford Borough Police.
William Wiltshire, Constable, Wolverhampton Borough Police.

Fire Brigades
Alexander Wall Weir, Chief Superintendent, Liverpool City Police.
J. Franklin, Station Officer, London Fire Brigade.
Harry Darkins, Fireman, London Fire Brigade.

Scotland
James Tennant Gordon, Chief Constable of Fifeshire and Kinross-shire.
John Millar, Chief Constable, Hamilton Burgh Police.
John Morrison, Superintendent and Deputy Chief Constable, Lanarkshire Constabulary. 
David Pennie, Superintendent, Lanarkshire Constabulary.
George Macaulay, ex-Superintendent, Edinburgh City Police.
Alexander Harper, Superintendent, Glasgow City Police.

Ireland
Colonel Sir Neville Francis Fitzgerald Chamberlain, K.C.B., K.C.V.O., Inspector-General, Royal Irish Constabulary.
Thomas James Smith, Commissioner of Police, Belfast.
John Patrick Fogarty, Head Constable Major, Royal Irish Constabulary Depot, Dublin.

India
Claude Dundas James Carmichael, Deputy Inspector-General of Police, first grade, Madras Police.
Daniel Reilly, Sergeant, first grade, Madras Police.
Lawrence Edward Saunders, Assistant Superintendent of Police, second grade, Madras Police.
Murid Ismail, Sowar, Palanpur Agency Police, Bombay Police.
Ernest Edward Morris, Inspector, Criminal Investigation Department, Bombay City Police.
Harry Officer Moore, Assistant Superintendent, second grade, Bombay Police.
Hector Ratanji Kothawalla, Deputy Superintendent, second grade, Bombay District Police.
Thomas Charles Greenop, Chief Officer of the Fire Brigade of the Bombay Municipality. 
Khan Saheb Kamruddin Abdul Rehman, Inspector, second grade, Bombay District Police.
Robert Pryde, Inspector in the mounted branch of the Kathiawar Agency Police,Bombay Police.
Cecil Ward Chichele Plowden, C.I.E., officiating Inspector-General of Police, Bengal. 
Elahi Bux, Inspector, Constables' Training School, Rajshahi, Bengal Police.
Thomas Boyles, Inspector, second grade, Bengal Police.
Rai Sahib Jogesh Chandra Bhowmik, officiating Deputy Superintendent of Police, Murshidabad, Bengal Police.
Babu Basanta Kumar Chatarji, officiating Deputy Superintendent, Criminal Investigation Department, Bengal Police.
Montague Lewis Oakes, Superintendent, second grade, United Provinces Police. 
Bhikam Singh, Constable, Civil Police, Lucknow district. United Provinces Police. 
Ramzan Ali, Sub-Inspector, United Provinces Police.
Charles Stead, M.V.O., Superintendent and Personal Assistant to the Inspector-General of Police, Punjab Police.
Godfrey Hugh Prickard, Superintendent, Punjab Police.
Miran Baksh, Sub-Inspector, Punjab Police. 
Feroze Khan, Sub-Inspector, Punjab Police.
Percy Frederic de la Feuillade Sherman, District Superintendent, third grade, Burma Police.
Kenneth Campbell Macdonald, District Superintendent, third grade, Burma Police. 
William Wentworth Forbes, District Superintendent, second grade, Burma Police. 
Dhandraj, Constable, Rangoon Town Police. 
Robert Thomas Dundas, officiating Inspector-General of Police, Bihar and Orissa Police. 
Rai Bahadur Janki Prasad Tiwari, District Superintendent (retired), Bihar and Orissa Police.
Jeodhari Singh, Constable, Bihar and Orissa Police.
Herbert Spence, Deputy Inspector-General of Police, Eastern Kange, Central Provinces Police.
Abbas Ali, Constable, Seoni District Police, Central Provinces Police.
Jarnaluddin, Subadar-Major, Naga Hills Battalion, Assam Military Police.
Hari Ram, Jemadar, Naga Hills Battalion, Assam Military Police.
Norman Thomas Duncan, Assistant Superintendent of Police, first grade, District Officer, North-West Frontier Constabulary.
Khan Bahadur Hafiz Zain ul-Abdin Khan, Deputy Superintendent, third grade, North-West Frontier Police.
Abdul Rahim, Inspector, fourth grade, North-West Frontier Police.
Ganga Singh, Inspector, Baluchistan Police.

Colonial Forces
Nicholas Power, late Chief of Police, City of Halifax, Nova Scotia.
Hedley John Rowney, Constable, South Australia Police.
John Sullivan, Inspector-General of Constabulary, Newfoundland.
Lieutenant-Colonel Edward Bell, Chief Inspector of the Leeward Islands Police.

Distinguished Service Order (DSO)
Major Arthur Harwood French, Royal Marine Light Infantry, Royal Marine Brigade, Royal Naval Division.
Engineer Lieutenant-Commander Edward Hickman Tucker Meeson, His Majesty's Ship " Laurel."
Lieutenant-Commander Edmund Laurence Braithwaite Lockyer, His Majesty's Ship " Carmania."
Squadron Commander Edward Featherstone Briggs, Royal Naval Air Service.
Flight Commander John Tremayne Babington, Royal Naval Air Service.
Flight Lieutenant Sidney Vincent Sippe, Royal Naval Air Service.
Captain The Honourable Herbrand Charles Alexander, 5th (Royal Irish) Lancers.
Major Alexander George Arbuthnot, 24th Battery, Royal Field Artillery.
Lieutenant John Dopping Boyd, 1st Battalion, The Queen's (Royal West Surrey Regiment).
Captain Cyril Darcy Vivien Cary-Barnard, 2nd Battalion, The Duke of Edinburgh's (Wiltshire Regiment).
Second Lieutenant Francis Graham, 51st Battery, Royal Field Artillery.
Lieutenant The Honourable Julian Henry Francis Grenfell, 1st (Royal) Dragoons.
The Reverend Percy Wyndham Guinness, B.A., Chaplain to the Forces, 3rd Cavalry Brigade.
Second Lieutenant Richard Lambart, Intelligence Corps.
Lieutenant (Temporary Captain) Donald Swain Lewis, Royal Engineers and Royal Flying Corps.
Lieutenant Noel Yvon Loftus Welman, 1st Battalion, The Duke of Cambridge's Own (Middlesex Regiment).
Captain Gerald Charles Balfour Buckland, 2nd Battalion, 8th Gurkha Rifles.
Captain Robert Foster Dill, 129th Duke of Connaught's Own Baluchis.
Captain Lionel Douglas Vernon, 37th Battery, Royal Field Artillery.

Distinguished Service Cross (DSC)
Lieutenant George Lionel Davidson, late His Majesty's Ship " Loyal,"
Lieutenant Gerald Gordon Grant, Royal Naval Volunteer Reserve, Royal Naval Division. 
Sub-Lieutenant Charles Oscar Frittriof Modin, Royal Naval Volunteer Reserve, Royal Naval Division.
Lieutenant David James Gowney, Royal Marine Light Infantry, Royal Marine Brigade, Royal Naval Division.
Lieutenant Harold Owen Joyce, late His Majesty's Ship "Vestal."
Lieutenant Douglas Reid Kinnier, Royal Naval Reserve, S..S. " Ortega."

Distinguished Service Medal (DSM)

Naval Brigade
Chief Petty Officer Bernard Henry Ellis, No. 748, B.Co., R.N.V.R., London.
Chief Petty Officer Payne, D.Co.
Petty Officer William Wallace, O.N., Dev. 211130.
Stoker Petty Officer William Stephen Cole, O.N., Ch. 101113.
Leading Seaman (Acting) Henry Lowe, R.N.R.,Dev., No.. B. 2542.
Ordinary Seaman George Ripley, new army recruit, C.Co. (now R.N.V.R.), K.W./755. 
Ordinary Seaman T. Machen, new array recruit, C.Co. (now R.N.V.R.).

Royal Marine Brigade
R.F.R. Ch. 661. Serjeant-Major (Acting) James Thomas Galliford, R.M.L.I.
R.F.R. Oh. 426. Quartermaster - Serjeant George James Kenny, R.M.L.I.
R.F.R. Ch. 631. Serjeant Gideon Harry Bruce, R.M.L.I.
Ch. 18717. Lance-Corporal Thomas Charles Franks, R.M.L.I.
Ply. 7685. Lance-Corporal Walter John Cook, R.M.L.I.
R.F.R. Ch. 194. Private George Henry Hall, R.M.L.I.
R.F.R. Ch. 1585. Private Charles Joseph Fleet, R.M.L.I.
Ch. 18446. Private Stuart Lang, R.M.L.I. 
Senior Reserve Attendant Edmund Walch, Royal Naval Auxiliary Sick Berth Reserve, O.N., M. 9522.

For the operations off the Belgian Coast from the 17th October to the 9th November: —
" Falcon." Petty Officer Robert Chappell, O.N., 207788 (since died of wounds received in action).
" Falcon." Petty Officer Frederick William Georgeson Motteram, O.N., 183216.
" Brilliant." Leading Seaman John Thomas Knott, O.N., J. 1186.
"Falcon." Able Seaman Ernest Dimmock, O.N., 204549.
" Mersey." Boy, 1st Class, Herbert Edward Sturman, O.N., J. 24887.

For service in the Dardanelles in Submarine " B.ll " on the 13th December:— .
Petty Officer William Charles Milsom, O.N., 182452.
Petty Officer Tomas Henry Davey, O.N., 215464.
Chief Engine Room Artificer, 2nd Class, John Harding, O.N., 270410.
Engine Room Artificer, 1st Class, Anthony Douglas, O.N., 270773.
Stoker Petty Officer Patrick McKenna, O.N., 284570.
Leading Seaman Alfred Edmund Perry, O.N., 234677.
Leading Seaman Wilfrid Charles Mortimer, O.N., 219476.
Able Seaman Norman Lester Rae, O.N., 232229.
Able Seaman George Read, O.N., 231010.
Able Seaman Edward Buckle, O.N., 237869. 
Able Seaman Tom Blake, O.N., J. 1383.
Signalman Frederick George Foote, O.N., J. 1862.
Acting Leading Stoker John Henry Sowden, O.N., 308448.
Stoker, 1st Class, Stephen James Lovelady, O.N., K. 2240.

Military Cross (MC)
Lieutenant G. F. H. Brooke, 16th Lancers (Staff Captain).
Lieutenant (temporary Captain) A. H. L. Soames, 3rd Hussars (Flight Commander, Royal Flying Corps, Military Wing).
Lieutenant (temporary Captain in Army) C. W. Wilson, Royal Flying Corps, Special Reserve.
Lieutenant (temporary Captain in Army) E. L. Conran, 2nd County of London Yeomanry (Flight Commander, Royal Flying Corps, Military Wing).
Lieutenant A. L. E. Smith, 1st Life Guards. 
Second Lieutenant C. Pooley, 5th Dragoon Guards.
Lieutenant G. F. A. Pigot-Moodie, 2nd Dragoons.
Captain E. H. L. Beddington, 16th Lancers. 
Lieutenant G.W. Gore-Langton, 18th Hussars. 
Second Lieutenant R. Y. K. Walker, Royal Horse Artillery.
Captain F. L. Congreve, Royal Field Artillery. 
Captain A. G. Gillman, Royal Field Artillery. 
Captain D. D. Rose, Royal Field Artillery. 
Captain D. R. Macdonald, Royal Field Artillery.
Lieutenant J. E. L. Clarke, Royal Field Artillery (deceased). 
Lieutenant G. E. W. Franklyn, Royal Field Artillery.
Lieutenant A. R. Rainy, Royal Field Artillery.
Lieutenant P. E. Inchbald, Royal Field Artillery.
Lieutenant (temporary) R. R. W. Bell, Royal Field Artillery.
Lieutenant F. McC. Douie, Royal Engineers (1st King George's Own Sappers and Miners).
Second Lieutenant (temporary) C. Shergold, Royal Engineers. 
Quartermaster and Honorary Lieutenant G. F. W. Willicott, Royal Engineers. 
Captain Hon. W. A. Cecil, Grenadier Guards (deceased).
Lieutenant Hon. H. W. Gough, Irish Guards. 
Captain T. J. Uzielli, Royal Lancaster Regiment.
Captain G. 0. Sloper, Northumberland Fusiliers.
Second Lieutenant E. W. Tyler, Royal Fusiliers
Captain (temporary) G. C. Lyle, Norfolk Regiment.
Captain (temporary) C. E. G. Shearman, Bedfordshire Regiment.
Lieutenant F. H. L. Rushton, Royal Irish Regiment (deceased).
Captain H. G. B. Miller, Royal Scots Fusiliers. 
Second Lieutenant W. F. Watkins, Gloucestershire Regiment, Special Reserve. 
Captain (temporary) S. A Gabb, Worcestershire Regiment.
Quartermaster and Honorary Lieutenant G. E. Hyson, East Surrey Regiment.
Lieutenant C. H. Woodhouse, Dorsetshire Regiment.
Lieutenant B. V. Fulcher, South Lancashire Regiment (deceased).
Captain G. B. Rowan-Hamilton, Royal Highlanders.
Captain G. Blewitt, Oxfordshire and Buckinghamshire Light Infantry.
Captain (temporary) G. C. Binsteed, Essex Regiment.
Captain (temporary) E. J. W. Spread, Loyal North Lancashire Regiment.
Captain G. St. G. Robinson, Northamptonshire Regiment.
Second Lieutenant H. S. Doe, Royal West Kent Regiment.
Captain R. H. Willan, King's Royal Rifle Corps (Army Signal Service).
Lieutenant J. H. S. Dimmer, V.C., King's Royal Rifle Corps.
Lieutenant J. S. Harper, Manchester Regiment.
Captain A. P. D. Telfer-Smollett, Highland Light Infantry.
Captain W . M. Thomson, Seaforth Highlanders.
Lieutenant D. Cameron, Cameron Highlanders.
Lieutenant (temporary) W.H. Liesching, Royal Irish Fusiliers.
Lieutenant R. I. Thomas, Connaught Rangers (deceased).
Second Lieutenant R. L. Spreckley, Connaught Rangers (deceased).
Second Lieutenant W. Bruen, Connaught Rangers.
Captain (temporary) T. J. Leahy, Royal Dublin Fusiliers.
Lieutenant C. L. St. J. Tudor, Army Service Corps.
Lieutenant C. W. R. Langmaid, Army Service Corps.
Second Lieutenant C. J. Martin, Army Service Corps.
Second Lieutenant M. Burke, Army Service Corps.
Captain H. Stewart, M.B., Royal Army Medical Corps.
Captain E. D. Caddell, M.B., Royal Army Medical Corps.
Lieutenant C. Helm, Royal Army Medical Corps.
Lieutenant (temporary) E. J. Wyler, M.D., Royal Army Medical Corps.
Captain J. F. Murphy, M.B., Royal Army Medical Corps, Special Reserve. 
Lieutenant C. J. Cockburn, 6th Jat Light Infantry.
Captain D. H. Acworth, 55th Coke's Rifles. 
Captain G. S. Bull, 58th Vaughan's Rifles.
Captain J. R. L. Heyland, 9th Gurkha Rifles. 
Captain Kanwar Indarjit Singh, M.B., Indian Medical Service (deceased).
Jemadar Inchha Ram, 6th Jat Light Infantry. 
Subadar Sant Singh, 34th Sikh Pioneers.
Subadar Thakur Singh, 47th Sikhs.
Subadar Zaman Khan, 129th Baluchis. 
Subadar Nain Sing Chinwarh, 39th Garhwal Rifles.
Serjeant-Major D. S. Jillings, Royal Flying Corps (Military Wing).
Serjeant-Major J. Ramsay, Royal Flying Corps (Military Wing). 
Serjeant-Major E. J. Parker, Royal Flying Corps (Military Wing).
Serjeant-Major E. Ludlow, Grenadier Guards. 
Serjeant-Major J. A. Danoey, Coldstream Guards.
Serjeant-Major T. S. Tate, Scots Guards.
Serjeant-Major J. H. Martin, Royal Scots. 
Serjeant-Major E. Dakin, Royal Lancaster Regiment.
Serjeant-Major T. Caddy, Liverpool Regiment. 
Serjeant-Major A. Stapleton, Lincolnshire Regiment.
Serjeant-Major R. Burton, Suffolk Regiment. 
Serjeant-Major J. F. Plunkett, Royal Irish Regiment.
Serjeant-Major N. MacWhinnie, King's Own Scottish Borderers (deceased).
Serjeant-Major T. V. W. Roberts, South Lancashire Regiment.
First Class Staff Serjeant-Major J. T. Main, Army Service Corps.
Mechanist Serjeant-Major T. D. Hopper, Army Service Corps.
Staff Serjeant-Major V. B. Walter, Army Service Corps.
Staff Serjeant-Major S. J. Webster, Army Service Corps.
Mechanist Serjeant-Major B. W. Nicholson, Army Service Corps.
Staff Serjeant-Major W. Taylor, Army Service Corps.
Staff Serjeant-Major B. W. Badcock, Army Service Corps.
Serjeant-Major R. Cox, Royal Army Medical Corps.
Serjeant-Major A. T. Hasler, Royal Army Medical Corps.
Serjeant-Major T. E. Coggon, Royal Army Medical Corps.
Serjeant-Major B.. J. Anderson, Royal Army Medical Corps.
Serjeant-Major E. R. Loft, Royal Army Medical Corps.
Serjeant-Major R. J. McKay, Royal Army Medical Corps.

Order of British India

First Class with the title of Sardar Bahadur
Risaldar Khwaja Muhammad Khan Bahadur, I.D.S.M., A.D.C., Order of British India, Second Class, Queen Victoria's Own Corps of Guides (Frontier Force).

Second Class with the title of Bahadur
Subadar Arsla Khan, I.O.M., 57th Wilde's Rifles (Frontier Force).
Subadar Balbahadur Khattri, 1st Battalion, 9th Gurkha Rifles.
Subadar-Major Fateh Sing Newar, 2nd Battalion, 2nd King Edward's Own Gurkha Rifles (The Sirmoor Rifles).
Subadar Jagat Sing Rawat, I.O.M., 1st Battalion, 39th Garhwal Rifles.
Subadar-Major Abdul Ali, 58th Rifles (Frontier Force).

Indian Order of Merit (IOM)

Second Class
Naik Sar Amir.
Colour-Havildar Ghulam Mahomed.
Lanoe-Naik Said Akbar. 
Havildar Yakub Khan. 
Sepoy Daulat Khan.
Sepoy Usman Khan.
Senior Sub-Assistant Surgeon Pandit Shanker Dass.
Lance-Naik Biaz Gul.
Sepoy Zarif Khan.
Naik Padamdhoj Gurung.
Lance-Naik Jaman Sing Rana.
Lance-Naik Jaman Sing Khattri.
Rifleman Kalamu Bisht.
Lance-Naik Sankaru Gusain.
Havildar Alam Sing Negi.
Rifleman Ganesh Singh Sajwan.
Havildar Karam Singh.
Havildar Hari Persad Thapa.
Sub-Assistant Surgeon Harnam Singh
Havildar Nikka Singh.
Sapper Dalip Singh.
Jemadar Ram Rup Singh.
Ward Orderly Madhu

Distinguished Conduct Medal (DCM)
Acting Serjeant Ashby, E., 2nd Battalion, Oxfordshire and Buckinghamshire Light Infantry.
Corporal Askew, W. J., 2nd Battalion, Coldstream Guards.
Acting Corporal Badcock, G., 1st Battalion, Royal Berkshire Regiment.
Company Serjeant-Major Bailey, 1st Battalion, Loyal North Lancashire Regiment.
Serjeant Baillie, W ., 2nd Battalion, Highland Light Infantry.
Corporal Baker, D. G., 5th Lancers. 
Acting Corporal Baldwin, R., 2nd Battalion, Worcestershire Regiment.
Private Banner, J. W., 2nd Battalion; Worcestershire Regiment.
Private Barclay, 1st Battalion, Scottish Rifles.
Private Barnett, L., 2nd Battalion, Coldstream Guards.
Serjeant Barnfield, J. L., Royal Army Medical Corps (Field Ambulance) (S.R.). 
Corporal Barry, F., 59th Field Company, Royal Engineers.
Acting Company Quartermaster-Serjeant Barton, J., 2nd Battalion, Essex Regiment. 
Private Beale, A., 2nd Battalion, Royal Sussex Regiment.
Serjeant Bennett, 2nd Battalion, Leinster Regiment.
Driver Bianchi, F., 23rd Field Company, Royal Engineers.
Private Black, R., 1st Battalion, South Wales Borderers.
Serjeant Blakemore, W. G., 1st Battalion, Scottish Rifles.
Private Booth, C. H., 3rd Battalion, Coldstream Guards.
Corporal Bradford, W ., 2nd Battalion, Highland Light Infantry.
Company Serjeant-Major Bradish, A., 2nd Battalion, Worcestershire Regiment. 
Squadron Serjeant-Major Cordwell, C. E., 3rd Dragoon Guards.
Private Carrington, R. H ., 1st Battalion, Leicestershire Regiment.
Corporal Chambers, A. G., 5th Field Company, Royal Engineers.
Serjeant Clark, E. J., 15th Hussars. 
Private Clark, J ., 1st Battalion, Shropshire Light Infantry.
Private Clarkson, J., 1st Battalion, Leicestershire Regiment.
Second Corporal Clifford, F. W., 3rd Section, 2nd Signal Company, Royal Engineers.
Private Clifford, 2nd Battalion, Leinster Regiment.
Private Cline, J. R., 6th Dragoon Guards.
Serjeant Cobb, A. J., 5th Lancers.
Private Coe, G. H., 3rd Battalion, Coldstream Guards.
Lance-Corporal Colgrave, J., 5th Lancers. 
Serjeant Cox, B.L., 1st Battalion, Dorsetshire Regiment.
Corporal Cremetti, M. A. E., 4th Signal Troop, Royal Engineers.
Bombardier Crompton, W. J., 71st Battery, Royal Field Artillery.
Lance-Corporal Curtis, W. J., 5th Field Company, Royal Engineers.
Serjeant Curzon, H., 2nd Battalion, King's Royal Rifle Corps.
Corporal Cyster, P. G., 1st Battalion, Bedfordshire Regiment.
Gunner Davidson, J. C., 71st Battery. Royal Field Artillery.
Acting Corporal Day, H., 1st Battalion, Royal Berkshire Regiment.
Lance-Corporal Delaney, W., 1st Battalion, Irish Guards.
Corporal Dickinson, E., 1st Royal Dragoons.
Sapper Duckett, A., 5th Field Company, Royal Engineers.
Acting Company Serjeant-Major Durrans, W . B., 1st Battalion, Lincolnshire Regiment.
Private Edom, R., 1st Battalion, Scots Guards.
Serjeant Edwards, B. P., 12th Lancers. 
Lance-Corporal Edwards, E ., 1st Battalion, Loyal North Lancashire Regiment. 
Acting Serjeant Edwards, H., 2nd Battalion, Oxfordshire and Buckinghamshire Light Infantry.
Serjeant-Major Elliott, C. J. M., 1st Royal West Surrey Regiment.
Serjeant Ellis, G., 2nd Battalion, Worcestershire Regiment. 
Acting Corporal Enticott, J., 3rd Hussars.
Private (Acting Corporal) Flowers, E. W., Army Service Corps.
Serjeant Forwood, H., 3rd Battalion, East Kent Regiment.
Acting Squadron Serjeant-Major Frane, T., 11th Hussars.
Acting Squadron Serjeant-Major Fraser, J. H., 2nd Dragoon Guards.
Bandsman Frere, T., 3rd Hussars. 
Corporal Goodman, J., 2nd Battalion, King's Royal Rifle Corps.
Private Gratton, E. H., 1st Battalion, Leicestershire Regiment.
Acting Serjeant-Major Grant, 1st Battalion, Royal Lancaster Regiment.
Private Grogan, A., 1st Battalion, Leicestershire Regiment.
Private Gudgeon, C. W., 1st Battalion, Northamptonshire Regiment.
Sapper Guinan, W., 59th Field Company, Royal Engineers.
Private Gunter, H., 1st Battalion, South Wales Borderers.
Private Hallamore, H ., Royal Army Medical Corps.
Private Harford, C., 15th Hussars. 
Corporal Harper, A ., 1st Dragoon Guards.
Serjeant Harradine, C., 1st Battalion, Irish Guards.
Acting Serjeant Harris, R. T., 1st Battalion, Middlesex Regiment.
Private Harris, E., 1st Battalion, Royal Berkshire Regiment.
Serjeant Harris, T., 5th Field Company. Royal Engineers.
Staff Quartermaster-Serjeant Harri- son, G., Army Service Corps.
Serjeant (Acting Company Quarter- master-Serjeant) Harvey, A., 2nd Battalion, West Riding Regiment.
Lance-Corporal Hill, F. C. G., 1st Royal Berkshire Regiment.
Corporal Hodder, H. G., No. Reserve Signal Company, Royal Engineers.
Second Corporal Hodgson, T., 26th. Field Company, Royal Engineers.
Serjeant Holness, H. H. J., 2nd Battalion, Grenadier Guards.
Private Holroyd, F. J., Royal Army Medical Corps.
Bandsman Hodson, A. R., 3rd Hussars.
Corporal Honnes, H., 48th Battery, Royal Field Artillery.
Regimental Corporal-Major Howard, F., 2nd Life Guards.
Acting Serjeant Hubbard, T., 1st Battalion, Lincolnshire Regiment.
Private John, G. W., 2nd Battalion, Welsh Regiment.
Private Jones, E., 2nd Battalion, Monmouthshire Regiment.
Private Jones, W., 1st Liverpool Regiment.
Serjeant Joseph, A. E., Royal Army Medical Corps (S.R.).
Private Joynt, F ., 1st Battalion, King's Royal Rifle Corps.
Acting Serjeant Kemp, A. E., 2nd Battalion, Worcestershire Regiment.
Serjeant Kirkcaldy, J ., 26th (Heavy), Battery, Royal Garrison Artillery.
Private Knight, F. A., 2nd Battalion, Coldstream Guards.
Company Serjeant-Major Laking, H .,1st Battalion, West Yorkshire Regiment. 
Bombardier Lamb, W. E., 48th Battery, Royal Field Artillery.
Serjeant Leddington, T., 2nd Battalion, Royal Welsh Fusiliers.
Company Serjeant-Major Lewington, J.,. 3rd Battalion, West Yorkshire Regiment. 
Lance-Corporal Lister, W ., 3rd Dragoon Guards.
Private Lively, C. E., 2nd Battalion, Worcestershire Regiment.
Lance-Corporal Lock, F., 1st Battalion, King's Royal Rifle Corps.
Machine-Gun Serjeant Longden, E ., 2nd. Battalion, Welsh Regiment.
Pioneer Loose, T., Royal Engineers (3rd Signal Company).
Pioneer Lowry, W ., Reserve Signal. Company, Royal Engineers.
Private Lucas, A. H., Royal Army Medical Corps.
Private Lusty, A. E. E., 5th Dragoon Guards.
Lance-Serjeant Mackay, W ., 15th Hussars. 
Serjeant McLellan, P. H ., 1st Royal Dragoons.
Private Macredy, H., 2nd Dragoons. 
Lance-Corporal Marshall, G.M. 1st Battalion, Middlesex Regiment.
Private Marshall, F ., Royal Army Medical Corps.
Serjeant Mart, A. J ., 1st Battalion, Bedfordshire Regiment.
Private Mathews, W. J., Royal Army Medical Corps, N. 2 Field Ambulance.
Private Mills, R. H., Royal Army Medical Corps.
Private Mitchell, A., list Battalion, Black Watch.
Private Molloy, T., 2nd Battalion, Connaught Rangers.
Private Moore, W., 1st Battalion, Irish Guards.
Private Moore, W ., 1st Battalion, Shropshire Light Infantry. 
Acting Serjeant-Major Moraghan, M., 2nd Battalion, Connaught Rangers.
Private Moir, D., 1st Royal Dragoons. 
Lance-Serjeant Moran, C., 1st Battalion, Irish Guards.
Serjeant Moran, T., 1st Battalion, Black Watch.
Private Morgan, H., 1st Liverpool Regiment.
Corporal Morrison, J. S., No. 1 Signal Company, Royal Engineers.
Private Murray, A., 2nd Battalion, Royal Inniskilling Fusiliers.
Private Mutter, J., 2nd Dragoons. 
Private Neville, F., 15th Hussars.
Lance-Corporal Newbery, F ., 1st Battalion, Somerset Light Infantry.
Serjeant-Drummer Nice, W. W., 1st Battalion, Coldstream Guards.
Serjeant Nisbet, J., 2nd Battalion, Highland Light Infantry.
Battery Quartermaster - Serjeant Noakes, F ., " K " Battery, Royal Horse. Artillery.
Acting Corporal Nilen, W ., 1st Battalion, Royal Berkshire Regiment.
Serjeant Owins, D. M., 2nd Battalion, Worcestershire Regiment.
Corporal Page, A. A., 4th Hussars. 
Company Quartermaster-Serjeant Pandfield, W. G., 2nd Battalion, Worcestershire Regiment.
Serjeant Pardoe, J., 5th Battalion, Worcestershire Regiment.
Private Parsons, C., 1st Liverpool Regiment. 
Lance-Corporal Parsons, L. H., 3rd Battalion, Coldstream Guards.
Private Payne, B. W., 1st Dragoon Guards (attached to 1st Life Guards).
Private Payne, F., Army Service Corps (S.R.).
Private Pickstone, E., 3rd Hussars.
Corporal Pinchin, E., 2nd Battalion, Monmouthshire Regiment.
Corporal Pitman, F. J., 5th Field Company, Royal Engineers.
Corporal Pond, L., 115th Battery, Royal Field Artillery.
Corporal Pratt, H. W., 117th Battery, Royal Field Artillery.
Acting Serjeant Pudney, P. A., 2nd  Battalion, Essex Regiment.
Corporal Pugh, M., 1st Battalion, South Wales Borderers.
Private Pym, J., 1st Royal Berkshire Regiment.
Private Ranger, H. J., Royal Army Medical Corps.
Serjeant Redpath, R., 1st Battalion, Black Watch.
Serjeant Richardson, C. C., 1st Battalion, Middlesex Regiment.
Corporal of Horse Rose, A., 1st Life Guards.
Quartermaster-Serjeant Rowe, A. R. R., 2nd Battalion, Sherwood Foresters.
Lance-Corporal Royal, G., 1st Battalion, Gloucestershire Regiment.
Private Royan, 2nd Battalion, Seaforth Highlanders.
Private Savage, R., 10th Hussars.
Lance-Corporal Seton, A.E ., 9th Lancers.
Private Senior, J., 2nd Battalion, Coldstream Guards.
Serjeant Sessions, A., 4th Dragoon Guards.
Squadron Quartermaster - Serjeant Shakespeare, W., 18th Hussars (P.S. North Somerset Yeomanry).
Corporal Shave, A. H., 117th Battery, Royal Field Artillery.
Private Shaw, W. C., 1st Royal Dragoons. 
Lance-Corporal Sheale, R. G., 1st Signal Company, Royal Canadian Engineers.
Lance-Serjeant Shields, J., 1st Battalion, Scots Guards.
Private Shipway, J., 1st Battalion, Gloucestershire Regiment.
Acting-Serjeant Siddons, W ., 4th Hussars.
Serjeant-Major Simpson, T., 2nd Battalion, Highland Light Infantry.
Private Simpson, W., 1st Battalion, Liverpool Regiment.
Lance-Serjeant Small, E. J., 3rd Battalion, Coldstream Guards.
Lance-Corporal Smart, A. H ., 5th Lancers.
Lance-Corporal Smith, J., South Staffordshire Regiment.
Serjeant Smith, J. H., 57th Battery, Royal Field Artillery.
Acting-Corporal Spain, F ., 1st Battalion, Rifle Brigade.
Driver Stratford, A., 117th Battery, Royal Field Artillery.
Lance-Serjeant Sutton, F .,2nd Battalion, Worcestershire Regiment.
Private Sweeny, J., 2nd Battalion, Connaught Rangers.
Sapper Sycamore, L. A ., Royal Engineers.
Lance-Corporal Tucker, A. A., 2nd Battalion, King's Royal Rifle Corps.
Private Tyrrell, A. J., 2nd Battalion, Oxfordshire and Buckinghamshire Light Infantry.
Sapper Vye, W. P., 5th Field Company, Royal Engineers.
Private Wellings, H. W., 6th Dragoon Guards.
Driver Wells, T., Army Service Corps. 
Company Serjeant-Major Whitley, B. F ., 2nd Battalion, King's Royal Rifle Corps. 
2nd Corporal Wilkinson, A. A., 26th Field Company, Royal Engineers.
Sapper Wilson, J., 5th Field Company, Royal Engineers.
Acting Serjeant Winter, W., 1st Battalion, Royal Berkshire Regiment.
Serjeant Woodland, W. G., 4th Dragoon Guards.
Serjeant Woodward, F., Royal Army Medical Corps (attached'Royal Scots Greys).
Lance-Corporal Wootton, W. H., 2nd Battalion, Durham Light Infantry.

References

New Year Honours
1915 in the United Kingdom
1915 awards